Burlington Hotel in Alma, Wisconsin was built in 1891.  It was listed on the National Register of Historic Places in 1982.

It is a frame building with a brick veneer. Both parts were built by brothers Anton and Ulrich Walser. It had a wooden front porch with pillars and a second story verandah which was removed in the 1950s.

It was located across the street from the Burlington Depot, and much of its business was in serving employees of the railroad.

References

Buildings and structures in Buffalo County, Wisconsin
Hotel buildings on the National Register of Historic Places in Wisconsin
Hotel buildings completed in 1891
National Register of Historic Places in Buffalo County, Wisconsin